Loška Vas is a settlement on the right bank of the Krka River in the Municipality of Dolenjske Toplice in Slovenia. The area is part of the historical region of Lower Carniola. The municipality is now included in the Southeast Slovenia Statistical Region. 

The local church is dedicated to Saint Martin and belongs to the Parish of Toplice. It dates to the late 17th century.

References

External links
Loška Vas on Geopedia

Populated places in the Municipality of Dolenjske Toplice